Thailand had a national team compete in the fifth Asian Netball Championship held in Colombo, Sri Lanka in 2001.

Thailand competed in the 7th Asian Youth Netball Championship held in 2010 in India.

References

Bibliography

External links 
Olympic Council of Asia